The Most Illustrious Order of the Royal House of Chakri was founded in 1882 by King Chulalongkorn (Rama V) of the Kingdom of Siam (now Thailand) to commemorate the Bangkok Centennial. The order is awarded to members of the House of Chakri (the Thai royal family), foreign heads of state and members of other royal houses.

Members of the order are entitled to use the postnominals ม.จ.ก.

Insignias

Sovereign
The Sovereign Grand Master of the order is Knight but the Star and Pendant have been decorated by diamonds and was called Maha Savamissaradhibodi. (Thai: มหาสวามิศราธิบดี)

Queen Consort
The Queen Consort of the Order is Dame but the Star have been decorated by diamonds and was called Maha Savamini. (Thai: มหาสวามินี)

Knight
The decoration consists of a single class (knight). The insignia is:
Pendant of Chakri, suspended from collar.
Pendant of Chula Chakri, attached onto the yellow sash, to wear over the left shoulder to the right hip.
Star of Chakri, to wear on the left breast.

Former officers
 Chancellor (Thai: ลัญจกราภิบาล): Only held by Chao Phraya Phasakornwongse (Phon Bunnag), his insignia was a collar but with a different pendant.
 Secretary (Thai: เลขานุการ): Only held by HSH Prince Prapakorn Malakul, his insignia was the same as the Chancellor but with ribbon.
 Officer (Thai: มุทรานุการ): Only held by Phra Banroepakdi (Korn Kornsut), his insignia was a ribbon with Pendant decorated by the Coat of Arms.

Living recipients of the order

Foreign recipients of the order

Notes
 Incorrectly referred to as Christian, Crown Prince of Denmark in the gazette.

References

External links
 The Most Illustrious Order of the Royal House of Chakri, Secretariat to the Cabinet of Thailand

Royal House of Chakri, Order of the
1882 establishments in Siam
Awards established in 1882
Orders, decorations, and medals of Thailand